Roger J Mills (1942-2020) was a former English international badminton player and coach.

Badminton career

Mills won 9 English National titles, Singles three years running, 1965, 1966, and 1967, Men's Doubles 1967 and 1970 plus Mixed Doubles 1965, 1968, 1969 and 1971. Roger was a Winston Churchill Fellow which he gained in 1974 for his contribution to badminton. https://www.wcmt.org.uk/users/roger-jmills1974

He won the 1969 All England Badminton Championships in mixed doubles with Gillian Perrin when this tournament was considered the sport's premier event (aside from the international team world championships, Thomas Cup and Uber Cup).

Mills competed in the 1966 British Empire and Commonwealth Games in Kingston, Jamaica winning the gold medal, in the mixed doubles with Angela Bairstow and a bronze medal, in the men's doubles with David Horton. Four years later he won a silver medal, in the mixed doubles with Perrin at the 1970 British Commonwealth Games in Edinburgh.

He represented Surrey and spent many of his years coaching in Surrey, most notably at Guildford University and at the Wimbledon Squash and Badminton Centre.

After his playing career, Roger continued his love of the sport of Badminton by becoming one of the leading coaches in the country where he took the position of Senior English National Coach before moving his focus to the development of youth badminton. In addition, Roger was the Part-Time Scottish National Coach in 1976 until 1980 where he provided new age coaching techniques to a generation of Scottish Badminton champions.

Roger's coaching and dedication to Badminton resulted in the development of many Champions at all ages and levels.

Roger has written and published a number of books on badminton and is a Winston Churchill Fellowship.

All England Badminton Championships

Commonwealth Games

English National Badminton Championships 

Juniors

Open Badminton Championships

Winston Churchill Fellow
The Fellowship was created by public subscription in 1965 as the living legacy of Sir Winston Churchill.  ‘We are empowering individuals to learn from the world, for the benefit of the UK. Today this idea is more valuable than ever’.

Roger was awarded the Winston Churchill Fellowship for his overseas research  on Badminton in China.

Published Books

References

English male badminton players
1942 births
Commonwealth Games gold medallists for England
Commonwealth Games silver medallists for England
Commonwealth Games bronze medallists for England
Commonwealth Games medallists in badminton
Living people
Badminton players at the 1966 British Empire and Commonwealth Games
Badminton players at the 1970 British Commonwealth Games
Medallists at the 1966 British Empire and Commonwealth Games
Medallists at the 1970 British Commonwealth Games